Arecibo Catena (Arecibo Vallis until March 2013) is a catena on Mercury.  It is named after Arecibo Observatory, the former large radio telescope in Puerto Rico.

It is located at latitude 27.5 S, longitude 28.4 W, in the hilly and chaotic terrain antipodal to Caloris Basin. 

Arecibo Catena is connected to Petrarch crater.

References

Surface features of Mercury